Barrel of Batteries is the first EP released by American indie rock band The War on Drugs, released on March 4, 2008 on  Secretly Canadian. The release featured five demos that the band was particularly drawn to. Upon its release, the band gave downloads of the EP away for free for a limited time.

The EP was recorded on lead singer Adam Granduciel's digital 8-track. His vocals have been described as "a modern Bruce Springsteen that had inherited Bob Dylan's vocal cadences as guitarist Kurt Vile sprinkled twinkling guitar around the edge."

Track listing
"Set Yr Sights"
"Arms Like Boulders"
"Pushing Corn"
"Toxic City #26"
"Buenos Aires Beach"
"Sweet Thing Reprise"

References

2008 debut EPs
The War on Drugs (band) albums